Khapri is a metro station on the Orange (North-South) line of the Nagpur Metro serving the Khapri area of Nagpur. It was opened to the public on 8 March 2019. The station is integrated with the Khapri railway station, and is linked with Wardha Road via a subway that passes under the main railway line.

The Nagpur Metro Rail Corporation Limited (now the Maharashtra Metro Rail Corporation Limited) awarded the contract to construct the station to Infrastructure Leasing & Financial Services (ILFS) in July 2016. Construction of the outer structure of the station was completed by November 2017, and interior work began in the same month.  The station was awarded a platinum rating by the Indian Green Building Council, the highest rating the Council presents for sustainable construction practices that reduce environmental impact. Construction of the station was completed by January 2019.

The station was originally proposed to be the southern terminus of the North-South Line. However, on 22 November 2017, Mahametro announced a 3 km southern extension to the line which added two new stations - Ecopark and Metro City - the latter becoming the southern terminus.

Design
The station's design was modeled on the Bandra suburban railway station in Mumbai, built in the Victorian style. Like Bandra station, Khapri station has a red roof covered by terracotta tiles, white-coloured steel trusses and a clock tower. Solar panels fitted on the station's roof supply around 65% of the total electricity required by the station.

The station's interiors are adorned by paintings, sculptures and other art depicting the culture of Nagpur, Vidarbha, Maharashtra and India. The station also contains shops and restaurants which occupy a total commercial space of about 15,000 square feet. The station has parking facilities that can accommodate 30 cars and 100 two-wheelers.

Station Layout

References

Nagpur Metro stations
Railway stations in India opened in 2019